

Current listings

|}

Former listing

|}

References

North Portland, Oregon
North